The  (pronounced "Crossbee") is a crossover city car produced by the Japanese carmaker Suzuki since December 2017 to be sold exclusively in Japan.

Overview 
The Xbee made its world premiere at the 2017 Tokyo Motor Show. Although being similar in styling to the Hustler kei car, they do not share the same mechanical parts. It uses the HEARTECT platform that is shared with the second-generation Ignis and third-generation Solio instead.

The Xbee is only available with a mild hybrid powertrain coupled to a 6-speed automatic transmission with paddle shifters. The four-wheel drive model is also equipped with hill descent control, which limits the speed to a steady  when engaged.

The facelifted model was unveiled on 13 July 2022.

References

External links 

 

Xbee
Cars introduced in 2018
2020s cars
Mini sport utility vehicles
Crossover sport utility vehicles
City cars
Front-wheel-drive vehicles
All-wheel-drive vehicles
Retro-style automobiles